Brigitte Totschnig (later Habersatter, born 30 August 1954) is a retired Austrian alpine skier.

Career
She competed at the 1972 and 1976 Winter Olympics and won a silver medal in the downhill in 1976. Totschnig finished seventh in the downhill at the FIS Alpine World Ski Championships 1978. Between 1975 and 1977 she had seven victories and 13 podiums at the World Cup, 11 of them in downhill; her best overall placement was fourth in the 1976–77 season. She retired after the 1977–1978 season, in which she won national titles in the downhill and combined. In 1978 she built the Aparthotel Olympia in Filzmoos and ran it since then. Totschnig was named Austrian Sportswoman of the Year in 1976 and in 1996 was awarded a silver medal for services to Austria. Her father-in-law, Walter Habersatter, competed for Austria in ski jumping.

References

External links
 
 

1954 births
Alpine skiers at the 1972 Winter Olympics
Alpine skiers at the 1976 Winter Olympics
Austrian female alpine skiers
Living people
Olympic alpine skiers of Austria
Olympic silver medalists for Austria
Olympic medalists in alpine skiing
Medalists at the 1976 Winter Olympics
FIS Alpine Ski World Cup champions
People from St. Johann im Pongau District
Sportspeople from Salzburg (state)